Zhecha is a rural locality (a settlement) in Starodubsky District, Bryansk Oblast, Russia. The population was 80 as of 2010. There are 4 streets.

Geography 
Zhecha is located 16 km north of Starodub (the district's administrative centre) by road. Volny is the nearest rural locality.

References 

Rural localities in Starodubsky District